Jan Štokr (born 16 January 1983) is a Czech volleyball player (opposite), a member of Czech Republic men's national volleyball team and Czech club VK Dukla Liberec. He is a multiple winner of the Club World Championship with the Italian club Diatec Trentino.

Career

Clubs
On July 8, 2010 Štokr signed a contract with Itas Diatec Trentino. In 2013 he went to Russian league, Dynamo Krasnodar. In 2016 he returned to Itas Diatec Trentino.

Sporting achievements

CEV Champions League
  2010/2011 - with Itas Diates Trentino
  2011/2012 - with Itas Diates Trentino

FIVB Club World Championship
  Qatar 2010 - with Itas Diates Trentino
  Qatar 2011 - with Itas Diates Trentino
  Qatar 2012 - with Itas Diates Trentino

National championship
 2003/2004  Czech Championship, with Odolena Voda
 2003/2004  Czech Cup, with Odolena Voda
 2010/2011  Italian Championship, with Itas Diates Trentino
 2011/2012  Italian Cup Serie A, with Itas Diates Trentino
 2011/2012  Italian Championship, with Itas Diates Trentino
 2012/2013  Italian Cup Serie A, with Itas Diates Trentino
 2012/2013  Italian Championship, with Itas Diates Trentino
 2016/2017  Italian Championship, with Diatec Trentino

Individually
 2011 Italian Championship - Most Valuable Player
 2011 Italian SuperCup - Most Valuable Player
 2012 The best volleyball player of Czech Republic
 2012 FIVB Club World Championship - Best Spiker
 2013 The best volleyball player of Czech Republic
 2014 Emir of Qatar Cup - Most Valuable Player

References

External links
 LegaVolley Serie A player profile

1983 births
Living people
Czech men's volleyball players
Czech expatriate sportspeople in Italy
Expatriate volleyball players in Italy
Czech expatriate sportspeople in Russia
Expatriate volleyball players in Russia
Czech expatriate sportspeople in Qatar
Expatriate volleyball players in Qatar
Czech expatriate sportspeople in South Korea
Expatriate volleyball players in South Korea
Italian Champions of men's volleyball
Modena Volley players
Umbria Volley players
Trentino Volley players
Suwon KEPCO Vixtorm players
Opposite hitters
People from Jindřichův Hradec District
Sportspeople from the South Bohemian Region